Sport and Travel in the Far East is a book published in 1910 by American ambassador and writer Joseph Grew. It highlights the hunting and the people of Asia, including hunting tiger in China. It was a favorite of Theodore Roosevelt, who was also an avid sportsman. Roosevelt wrote the introduction to the book, praising it.

Chapters
 I. Marseilles to Singapore
 II. Through the Malay Jungle
 III. Impressions of Northern India: Bombay, Jaipore, Amber, Agra
 IV. Impressions of Northern India: Cawnpore, Lucknow, Benares
 V. Waimungu and the Hot-Spring Country of New Zealand
 VI. The Journey Into Kashmir
 VII. Ibex-Shooting in the Mountains of Baltistan
 VIII. Markhor and Sharpu Shooting in Baltistan
 IX. Black Bear Honking in the Valley of Kashmir
 X. Kashmir to China
 XI. Hunting the Cave-Dwelling Tiger of China

External links 
Sport and Travel in the Far East (1910) at the Internet Archive

1910 non-fiction books
Hunting literature
Books about Asia